Tibbitt may refer to:

Paul Tibbitt, the showrunner of SpongeBob SquarePants from 2005 to 2015
Tibbitt Lake, a lake in Northwest Territories

See also
 Tibbetts (disambiguation)